Edward Sherman may refer to:
Edward Sherman (coach proprietor)  (c. 1777–1866), British coach proprietor from Berkshire
Edward F. Sherman, American professor at Tulane Law School

See also
Edward A. Sherman Publishing Company